Kalsoom is a Pakistani feminine given name. Notable people with the surname include:

Kalsoom Nawaz Sharif (1950–2018), First Lady of Pakistan
Kalsoom Perveen (1945–2020), Pakistani politician

Pakistani feminine given names